Casanova's Chinese Restaurant is a novel by Anthony Powell. It forms the fifth volume of the twelve-volume sequence A Dance to the Music of Time, and was originally published in 1960. Many of the events of the novel were included in the television adaptation broadcast on the United Kingdom's Channel 4 in 1997, comprising part of the second of four episodes. There was also an earlier, more comprehensive, BBC Radio adaptation.

As with several of the earlier volumes, there is a time-overlap with previous books, the first part returning to the period before the death of Mr. Deacon. However, Casanova's Chinese Restaurant concentrates on a new set of characters, principally the composer Hugh Moreland, (based on Powell's close friend Constant Lambert), his fiancée Matilda, and the critic Maclintick and his wife, Audrey, whose unhappy marriage forms a key part of the narrative.

The interweaving of historical with fictional events is more notable here, and is used to illuminate the characters, as for example in Erridge's ill-considered departure for the Spanish Civil War.

Reception

Much of the book's reception has been positive, with one reviewer  calling the novel 'by far the funniest in Powell's saga ... much of the story surpasses even Evelyn Waugh at his most scathingly satirical, and P. G. Wodehouse at his most daftly farcical' and with another  saying that the story was 'simply brilliant.' However, Evelyn Waugh himself, who reviewed all of the early instalments of the series, complained of "a sad disappointment ... only three pages of [Kenneth] Widmerpool."

1960 British novels
Novels by Anthony Powell
A Dance to the Music of Time
Chinese restaurants
Fictional restaurants
Fiction set in 1936
Fiction set in 1937
Heinemann (publisher) books